Scopulophila is a small genus of flowering plants in the pink family. Rockwort is a common name for plants in this genus.

Species

Scopulophila parryi - native to Mexico
Scopulophila rixfordii - native to California and Nevada

References

External links
Jepson Manual Treatment
USDA Plants Profile

Caryophyllaceae
Caryophyllaceae genera